Events from the year 1593 in Sweden

Incumbents
 Monarch – Sigismund

Events

 March - The Uppsala Synod introduce the confession of faith and ends the Liturgical Battle.
 A decision to re-open the Uppsala University is taken. 
 
 The new King arrives in Sweden from Poland.

Births

Deaths

 3 June - Katarina Bengtsdotter Gylta, abbess  (died 1520)

References

 
Years of the 16th century in Sweden
Sweden